Talco is a town in Titus County, Texas, United States. The population was 516 at the 2010 census.  The name is derived from a local candy bar (It was either a shelf carton or because the local people said it was "Texas-Arkansas-Louisiana Country hence Talco).  Also reports said it may have been a local company name Texas-Arkansas-Louisiana Company.  There are varying reports to what it was actually.

History 
Two post offices were established near the current site of Talco: Gouldsboro in 1856 and Goolesboro in 1878.  Due to name conflict the community changed its name to "Talco" based on the Texas, Arkansas, and Louisiana Candy Company initials on a candy wrapper. In 1912, Talco relocated to be closer to a railroad line.

Oil was discovered in 1936, leading to a big boom in the economy.  Talco called itself the "Asphalt capital of the world."

Geography

Talco is located at  (33.362131, –95.104090).

According to the United States Census Bureau, the city has a total area of 0.8 square miles (2.0 km), all of it land.

US Route 271 is a major north–south highway through Talco.  The community is a mile east of the Franklin County line.

Demographics

As of the 2020 United States census, there were 494 people, 258 households, and 206 families residing in the city.

Education
The City of Talco is served by the Rivercrest Independent School District (Talco-Bogata Consolidated Independent School District prior to July 1999).

It previously maintained Talco Elementary. The previous Talco school opened in 1939. The district began construction of the consolidated elementary on May 1, 2000 and the scheduled completion was in June 2001.

References

External links
  Talco, TX history 
 Riches Loom for Village Folk in Texas Oil Rush from the Texas Archive of the Moving Image
 https://news.google.com/newspapers?nid=861&dat=19670621&id=D_cnAAAAIBAJ&sjid=NlYDAAAAIBAJ&pg=2803,4782694.

Cities in Titus County, Texas
Cities in Texas